Football Club Kryvbas Kryvyi Rih was a professional Ukrainian football club based in Kryvyi Rih.

Until 2013 the club participated in professional competitions. In June 2013 the club went bankrupt and was expelled from the Ukrainian Premier League. There was a failed attempt to revive the club in 2014, until finally the club was reestablished again in 2015. In 2020, the club merged with Hirnyk Kryvyi Rih which took on the Kryvbas's brand.

History
The team was founded as FC Kryvyi Rih in 1959. The next year it was part of the republican sport society Avanhard. After a couple of years it changed to Hirnyk, before obtaining current its name in 1966. Over the years in the Soviet competitions Kryvbas became a record holder for Ukrainian championship wins tying it at four along with SKA Kiev.

Kryvbas debuted in the Ukrainian Premier League in the 1992–1993 season. They have been in the top league since their debut in the second season. Their best finish was in third place in the 1998–99 and 1999–2000 seasons which made them the only club out of a provincial city that managed to place among the top three best.

At the end of the UPL 2012–2013 season the team finished in 7th place, however, due to financial difficulties the club declared itself bankrupt in June 2013.

In 2013-14 local authorities created the Sport Club Kryvbas that included teams of several sports including football. FC Kryvbas played several friendlies in the spring of 2014. Due to the 2014 pro-Russian unrest in Ukraine, the project was suspended for undefined period. In the summer of 2015 there was created a public organization "Kryvbas maye buty" (Kryvbas has to be) that is involved in a revival of sportive symbol of the city.

In August 2015 FC Kryvbas was allowed to start at the mid-season of the Dnipropetrovsk Oblast Championship where it played 11 games winning four and losing five. At finish, the club ended up at the 10th place among 13 participants. In November 2015 it also was applying for the 2016–17 Ukrainian Second League. In 2016 FC Kryvbas started out in the 2016 Ukrainian Football Amateur League. The new club will start out at the Spartak Stadium that was renovated back in 2013 and holds approximately 4,000 seats.

Presidents and chairmen
 2013 – Oleksandr Livshyts
 2015 – Taras Stretovych

Honours
Championship of the Ukrainian SSR
Winners (4): 1971, 1975, 1976, 1981
Ukrainian First League
Winners (1): 1992
Ukrainian Cup
Runners-up: 2000

Football kits and sponsors

League and Cup history

Soviet Union

Ukraine

Managers

First team
 Myron Markevich (Jan 1996 – June 1996)
 Oleh Taran (July 1997 – Sept 2000)
 Hennadiy Lytovchenko (Sept 2000 – Dec 2001)
 Ihor Nadein (Jan 2002 – Aug 2002)
 Oleksandr Ishchenko (Aug 2002 – June 203)
 Volodymyr Muntyan (July 2003 – Dec 2003)
 Oleksandr Kosevych (Jan 2004 – Feb 2007)
 Oleh Taran (Feb 2007 – Dec 2009)
 Yuriy Maksymov (Jan 2010 – June 2012)
 Vitaliy Kvartsyanyi (June 2012 – July 2012)
 Oleh Taran (July 2012 – May 2013)

Reserve team
 Volodymyr Sharan (2004–2005)
 Andriy Kuptsov (2005–2007)
 Serhiy Mazur (2009–2012)

See also
FC Kryvbas Kryvyi Rih Reserves and Youth Team

References

External links
Club's fan website
Taras Stretovych: We hope to create a club where a foundation will be the specialized sports school of Olympic reserve Kryvbas-84, while the top will be a professional team. Club's fan site. 27 January 2016

 
1959 establishments in Ukraine
2020 disestablishments in Ukraine
Football clubs in the Ukrainian Soviet Socialist Republic
Association football clubs established in 1959
Association football clubs disestablished in 2020
Football clubs in Kryvyi Rih
Metallurgy association football clubs in Ukraine
Defunct football clubs in Ukraine